Hailu Yimenu (died 1993) was an Ethiopian politician who was the acting prime minister of the People's Democratic Republic of Ethiopia from November 8, 1989 until May 1991.

In May 1991, after hearing of Mengistu Haile Mariam's fall from power, he fled to the Italian embassy in Addis Ababa, along with Lieutenant General Tesfaye Gebre Kidan, Foreign Minister Berhanu Bayeh, and Chief of General Staff Addis Tedla. He was succeeded by Tesfaye Dinka.

While the other three remained at the embassy for years, Hailu committed suicide in 1993.

Following the death of General Tesfaye thirteen years later on 2 June 2004, rumors began to circulate caused by the embassy's lack of detail on the death of both General Tesfaye and Hailu's earlier suicide. The Ethiopian government demanded Italian records on the incidents during that month.

References

1993 deaths
Politicians who committed suicide
Prime Ministers of Ethiopia
Suicides in Ethiopia
Workers' Party of Ethiopia politicians
Year of birth missing